WMTB may refer to:

 WMTB-FM, a radio station (89.9 FM) licensed to serve Emmitsburg, Maryland, United States
 WMTB-LP, a low-power radio station (96.7 FM) licensed to serve St. Petersburg, Florida, United States